Morris Grant (May 11, 1845 – May 23, 1915), was an African American boxer who claimed the status of being the World Colored Heavyweight Champ and was the second boxer recognized as such. He likely was born into slavery in South Carolina, either on James Island or in an area of Charlestown at the site of the now-defunct town of St. James.

Fights with Charles Hadley
Grant fought his successor as the colored heavyweight champion Charles "The Professor" Hadley twelve times between 1881 and 1883. Their first recorded match was January 14, 1881, when he lost on points in a three-rounder. Hadley claimed the Grant's title after the victory.

Despite fighting Hadley ten more times while he was the colored champ, Grant failed to wrest the title from him. In their seventh fight, held on 4 May 1882 in  New York City, Grant did not lose for the first time, when the four-rounder was declared a no-contest. Their next fight, on June 20 of the same year, saw Morris finally beat the undefeated  Hadley (whose "official" record was 12-0-2 at the time), besting the champ on points in a four rounder. Hadley apparently did not put his belt at stake for the fight, for he continued as champion until 1883, when he was finally bested by George "Old Chocolate" Godfrey.

Morris lost three more fights to Hadley during his championship reign and one after Hadley lost the title to Godfrey. The last time they battled while Hadley was the colored champ was on 7 December 1882, when they fought in New York City for the Police Gazette Medal Championship of America. Morris was KO-ed in the third round. Their last fight was on 8 December 1883, exactly one year and one day after they had last met in the ring. Morris apparently was outpointed by the ex-champ. It was his last recorded pro bout.

Requiem for a Heavyweight

Morris Grant remained in New York City for the rest of his life. Although census records and city directories list his occupation as a "waiter,"  it appears that he worked primarily as a bouncer in bars in the Tenderloin section of Manhattan, as well as being employed by Tammany Hall as a political operative .

He married a woman twenty-five years his junior, by whom he had three daughters, but was widowed by 1910  By the end of his life, he was crippled to the extent that he had to walk with the use of two canes  and died in the Bronx in May 1915.

Record
Grant's official record is five wins (two by knockout) against 10 losses (he was KO-ed four times) and one draws. He also recorded one newspaper decision win.

Legacy & Honors

In 2020 award-winning author Mark Allen Baker published the first comprehensive account of The World Colored Heavyweight Championship, 1876-1937, with McFarland & Company, a leading independent publisher of academic & nonfiction books. This history traces the advent and demise of the Championship, the stories of the talented professional athletes who won it, and the demarcation of the color line both in and out of the ring.

For decades the World Colored Heavyweight Championship was a useful tool to combat racial oppression-the existence of the title a leverage mechanism, or tool, used as a technique to counter a social element, “drawing the color line.”

Professional boxing record

References

Boxers from South Carolina
Heavyweight boxers
African-American boxers
World colored heavyweight boxing champions
1845 births
1915 deaths
American male boxers
20th-century African-American people